Troadio Daniel Duarte Barreto (born 3 April 1977) is a Paraguayan football manager and former player who played as a midfielder. He is the current manager of General Caballero JLM.

External links
 

1977 births
Living people
People from Villarrica, Paraguay
Association football midfielders
Paraguayan footballers
Paraguayan expatriate footballers
Sportivo Luqueño players
Club Sol de América footballers
Club Guaraní players
Club Nacional footballers
Sport Huancayo footballers
C.S.D. Macará footballers
Barcelona S.C. footballers
Expatriate footballers in Ecuador
Expatriate footballers in Peru
Paraguayan football managers
Guaireña F.C. managers
Club General Caballero (Juan León Mallorquín) managers